Dholavira is an archaeological site at Khadirbet in Bhachau Taluka of Kutch District, in the state of Gujarat in western India, which has taken its name from a modern-day village  south of it. Also known locally as Kotada timba, the site contains ruins of a city of the ancient Indus Valley civilization. Earthquakes have repeatedly affected Dholavira, including a particularly severe one around 2600 BC. 

Dholavira's location is on the Tropic of Cancer. It is one of the five largest Harappan sites and the most prominent of archaeological sites in India belonging to the Indus Valley Civilization. It is located on Khadir bet island in the Kutch Desert Wildlife Sanctuary in the Great Rann of Kutch. The  quadrangular city lay between two seasonal streams, the Mansar in the north and Manhar in the south. The site was thought to be occupied from c.2650 BCE, declining slowly after about 2100 BCE, and to have been briefly abandoned then reoccupied until c.1450 BCE; however, recent research suggests the beginning of occupation around 3500 BCE (pre-Harappan) and continuity until around 1800 BCE (early part of Late Harappan period).

The site was initially discovered by a resident of Dholavira village, Shambhudan Gadhvi, in early 1960s who made efforts to bring government attention to the location. The site was "officially" discovered in 1967-68 by J. P. Joshi, of the Archaeological Survey of India (ASI), and is the fifth largest of eight major Harappan sites. It has been under excavation since 1990 by the ASI, which opined that "Dholavira has indeed added new dimensions to personality of Indus Valley Civilisation." The other major Harappan sites discovered so far are Harappa, Mohenjo-daro, Ganeriwala, Rakhigarhi, Kalibangan, Rupnagar and Lothal.

It was named as a UNESCO World Heritage Site under the name Dholavira: a Harappan City on 27 July 2021.

Chronology of Dholavira

Ravindra Singh Bisht, the director of the Dholavira excavations, has defined the following seven stages of occupation at the site:

Recent C14 datings and stylistic comparisons with Amri II-B period pottery shows the first two phases should be termed Pre-Harappan Dholaviran Culture and re-dated as follows: Stage I (c. 3500-3200 BCE), and Stage II (c. 3200-2600 BCE).

Excavations
Excavation was initiated in 1989 by the ASI under the direction of Bisht, and there were 13 field excavations between 1990 and 2005. The excavation brought to light the  urban planning and architecture, and unearthed large numbers of antiquities such as, animal bones, gold, silver, terracotta ornaments, pottery and bronze vessels. Archaeologists believe that Dholavira was an important centre of trade between settlements in south Gujarat, Sindh and Punjab and Western Asia.

Architecture and material culture

Unlike Harappa and Mohenjo-daro, the city was constructed to a pre-existing geometrical plan consisting of three divisions – the citadel, the middle town, and the lower town. The acropolis and the middle town had been  furnished with their own defence-work, gateways, built-up areas, street system, wells, and large open spaces. The acropolis is the most thoroughly fortified and complex area in the city, of which it appropriates the major portion of the southwestern zone. The towering "castle" stands is defended by double ramparts. Next to this stands a place called the 'bailey' where important officials lived. There are extensive structure-bearing areas which are outside yet integral to the fortified settlement. Beyond the walls, another settlement has been found. The most striking feature of the city is that all of its buildings, at least in their present state of preservation, are built of stone, whereas most other Harappan sites, including Harappa itself and Mohenjo-daro, are almost exclusively built of brick. Dholavira is flanked by two storm water channels; the Mansar in the north, and the Manhar in the south. In the town square, there is a area high above the ground, called the "Citadel''.

Reservoirs

Bisht, who retired as the Joint Director-General of the ASI, said, "The kind of efficient system of Harappans of Dholavira, developed for conservation, harvesting and storage of water speaks eloquently about their advanced hydraulic engineering, given the state of technology in the third millennium BCE." One of the unique features of Dholavira is the sophisticated water conservation system of channels and reservoirs, the earliest found anywhere in the world, built completely of stone. The city had massive reservoirs, three of which are exposed. They were used for storing fresh water brought by rains or to store water diverted from two nearby rivulets. This clearly came in response to the desert climate and conditions of Kutch, where several years may pass without rainfall. A seasonal stream which runs in a north–south direction near the site was dammed at several points to collect water. In 1998, another reservoir was discovered in the site.

The inhabitants of Dholavira created sixteen or more reservoirs of varying size during Stage III. Other reservoirs were excavated, some into living rock. Recent work has revealed two large reservoirs, one to the east of the castle and one to its south, near the Annexe.

They skirt the city, while the citadel and bath are centrally located on raised ground. There is also a large well with a stone-cut trough connecting it to a drain meant for conducting water to a storage tank. The bathing tank had steps descending inwards.

Seal making
Some of the seals found at Dholavira, belonging to Stage III, contained animal only figures, without any type of script. It is suggested that these type of seals represent early conventions of Indus seal making.

Other structures and objects

A huge circular structure on the site is believed to be a grave or memorial, although it contained no skeletons or other human remains. The structure consists of ten radial mud-brick walls built in the shape of a spoked wheel. A soft sandstone sculpture of a male with phallus erectus but head and feet below ankle truncated was found in the passageway of the eastern gate. Many funerary structures have been found (although all but one were devoid of skeletons), as well as pottery pieces, terra cotta seals, bangles, rings, beads, and intaglio engravings.

Hemispherical constructions
Seven hemispherical constructions were found at Dholavira, of which two were excavated in detail, which were constructed over large rock cut chambers. Having a circular plan, these were big hemispherical elevated mud brick constructions. One of the excavated structures was designed in the form of a spoked wheel. The other was also designed in same fashion, but as a wheel without spokes. Although they contained burial goods of pottery, no skeletons were found except for one grave, where a skeleton and a copper mirror were found. A necklace of steatite beads strung to a copper wire with hooks at both ends, a gold bangle, gold and other beads were also found in one of the hemispherical structures.

The Archaeological Survey of India, which conducted the excavation, opines that these “hemispherical structures remind one of early Buddhist stupas.” and that "the kind of design that is of spoked wheel and unspoked wheel also remind one of the Sararata-chakra-citi and sapradhi-rata-chakra-citi mentioned in the Satapatha Brahmana and Sulba-sutras".

Findings

One poorly preserved  seated male figure made of stone has also been found, comparable to high quality two stone sculptures found at Harappa. Large black-slipped jars with pointed base were also found at this site. A giant bronze hammer, a big chisel, a bronze hand-held mirror, a gold wire, gold ear stud, gold globules with holes, copper celts and bangles, shell bangles, phallus-like symbols of stone, square seals with Indus inscription and signs, a circular seal, humped animals, pottery with painted motifs, goblets, dish-on-stand, perforated jars, Terracotta tumblers in good shape, architectural members made of ballast stones, grinding stones, mortars, etc., were also found at this site. Stone weights of different measures were also found.

Coastal route
It is suggested that a coastal route existed linking Lothal and Dholavira to Sutkagan Dor on the Makran coast.

Language and script
The Harappans spoke an unknown language and their script has not yet been deciphered. It is believed to have had about 400 basic signs, with many variations. The signs may have stood both for words and for syllables. The direction of the writing was generally from right-to-left. Most of the inscriptions are found on seals (mostly made out of stone) and sealings (pieces of clay on which the seal was pressed down to leave its impression). Some inscriptions are also found on copper tablets, bronze implements, and small objects made of terracotta, stone and faience. The seals may have been used in trade and also for official administrative work. A lot of inscribed material was found at Mohenjo-daro and other Indus Valley Civilisation sites.

Sign board

The most significant discoveries at Dholavira was made in one of the side rooms of the northern gateway of the city, and is generally known as the Dholavira Signboard. The Harappans had arranged and set pieces of the mineral gypsum to form ten large symbols or letters on a big wooden board. At some point, the board fell flat on its face. The wood decayed, but the arrangement of the letters survived. The letters of the signboard are comparable to large bricks that were used in nearby walls. The inscription is one of the longest in the Indus script, with one of the symbols appearing four times, and this and its large size and public nature make it a key piece of evidence cited by scholars arguing that the Indus script represents full literacy. A four sign inscription with large letters on sandstone is also found at this site, considered first of such inscription on sandstone at any of Harappan sites.

References

External links

Excavations at Dholavira in Archaeological Survey of India website
Dholavira Pictures by Archaeological Survey of India website
Jurassic Park: Forest officials stumble upon priceless discovery near Dholavira; Express news service; 8 Jan 2007; Indian Express Newspaper
ASI's effort to put Dholavira on World Heritage map hits the roadblock; by Hitarth Pandya; 13 Feb 2009; Indian Express Newspaper
ASI to take up excavation in Kutch's Khirasara; by Prashant Rupera, TNN; 2 November 2009; Times of India

Populated places established in the 3rd millennium BC
Populated places disestablished in the 2nd millennium BC
Buildings and structures completed in the 29th century BC
Buildings and structures demolished in the 15th century BC
World Heritage Sites in India
1967 archaeological discoveries
Former populated places in India
Archaeological sites in Gujarat
Tourist attractions in Kutch district
History of Kutch
Monuments of National Importance in Gujarat
Indus Valley civilisation sites
Uninhabited islands of India
Islands of India